Charles Dekeukeleire (27 February 1905 – 2 June 1971) was a Belgian film director. He pioneered modern Belgian film with Henri Storck. He was inspired by French avant-garde cinema, particularly the works of Germaine Dulac.

Biography
Dekeukeleire was born in Ixelles and died in Werchter. For his first film, Combat de Boxe, produced in 1927, Dekeukeleire staged a boxing match in his room based on a poem by Paul Werrie. Dekeukeleire recruited two professional boxers, one of which was the Belgian lightweight boxing champion. The abrupt changes of scale, the use of overprinting, and the use of very short shots alternating between the spectators and the fighters made this film unusually complex for the Twenties.

He returned to this idea the following year with his masterpiece, Impatience, which is close to futurism. When it premiered, Charles Dekeukeleire stated that the gaze of the spectators must adapt, to let itself slip along with the film to feel the fragments of various lengths. The desire for physical contact with the machine is at the base of this film. In this drama with four characters (the Mountain, the abstract Motorbike, the Woman and the Blocks), the mechanical body, that of the Motorbike is strongly associated with the female body, first clothed and then naked with leather. Dekeukeleire exchanges parts between the two characters, resulting in a suggestive motorbike-woman/woman-motorbike. These two characters, the Motorbike and the Woman, then enter into interaction with the abstracted Mountain and Blocks, as if the director intended analogies between humanity, the animal world, the vegetable world and the mechanical world.

In 1929, he filmed  Histoire de détective, a surrealist inspiration. These first three avant-garde silent films made his name in cinematography.

His work then oscillated between documentaries and commissioned works. His work deals with race at times, for example in  Terres brûlées (Burned Grounds, 1934), which chronicles an automobile journey through the Belgian Congo.

Dekeukeleire made one hundred films in a career spanning four decades.

Writing career
Dekeukeleire published articles in reviews such as 7 Arts, Nouvelle Team, and The Latest News. He is also the author of two books: The Social Emotion and The Film and Thought, Extra Light, Brussels, 1947.

Films

1927
Combat de boxe -  35 mm, black and white, silent, 7' 30".
1928
Impatience - 35 mm, black and white, silent, 36'.
1929
Histoire de détective -  35 mm, black and white, silent, 49'.
1930
Witte vlam - 35 mm, black and white, silent, 11'.
Dixmude - 35 mm, black and white, silent.
1931
Santé, notre droit - 35 mm, black and white, silent.
Travailleurs! Ouvrez les yeux! - 35 mm, black and white, silent, 60'.
1932
Visions de Lourdes - 35 mm, black and white, silent, 18'.
1934
Terres brûlées - 35 mm, black and white, silent, 60'.
1936
Open signalen'Symphonie floraleDe Wol1937The Evil Eye (Het Kwade Oog / Le Mauvais oeil) - 35 mm, black and white, sound, 74'.Het AlbertkanaalHet LederProcessies en karnavals1938Images du travailDe Christelijke vakbewegingThèmes d'inspirationChanson de toile1939La Conserve alimentaireLes Noirs évoluentL' AcierStijl1942Au service des prisonniersEntr'aideSecours d'hiver1943Images de banqueNos enfants1945L'Usine aux champs1946MétamorphosesLa Vie recommence1947MaisonsFéerieLe Fondateur1948DiamantLe Trouble-fêteImages de la créationIn het land van Thijl UilenspiegelPrends gardeLes PèresLes Usines de ACEC194921 juilletLe CapiageL'Espace d'une vieNeuf cents hommesAu-delà des saisons1950ClôturesMétiers d'art de Flandres et de WallonieNocturneNotre grand patronLes PoldersLa Banque de Bruxelles1951Une question de gros sousBeauté, mon souciVoyage au pays du railL' Homme à la ville1952BloemenDanse en forme de poudrierLes Expériences du professeur MichotteFaire farceHainaut, terre tenue des dieux et du soleilInstallations pétrollières à AnversLuchtmachtChausseur, sachez chausser1953L'Abbaye de Maredsous -  Made for TVHumor in hout - Made for TV
1954Noblesse du boisL'AlerteLe Petit nuage/La chasse au nuage/Le nuage atomique1955Trois villes d'eau belgesFil d'acierVers un monde nouveau1956Een Kermishoedje -  Made for TVHet Museum voor folklore -  Made for TV

1957Charles-Quint: destin d'un empire 1 -  TV Series
1958Charles-Quint: destin d'un empire 2 -  TV SeriesKiemen van het licht1958Thèmes d'inspiration - 35 mm., black and white, 9'.

1962Poëzie in 625 lijnen'' -  TV Series

References

External links
 https://web.archive.org/web/20110725220925/http://www.davidbordwell.org/essays/dekeukeleire.php
 

Belgian film directors
1905 births
1971 deaths